Notebook is a 2019 Indian Hindi-language romantic drama film produced by Salman Khan under Salman Khan Films and Murad Khetani and Ashwin Varde under Cine1 Studios and directed by Nitin Kakkar. A remake of the 2014 Thai film The Teacher's Diary, it stars debutantes Zaheer Iqbal and Pranutan Bahl, daughter of actor Mohnish Bahl, in the lead roles, and tells the story of a young retired army officer who joins his father's school as a teacher to save it from closure, and falls in love with the previous teacher after reading through her memorabilia left behind in the drawers. The film was released on 29 March 2019 and received mixed response from critics with praises for leads performances.

Plot 
Captain Kabir Kaul, a young retired army officer, decides to teach in his late father's school, the Wular Public School as the school will be closed if there is no teacher to teach. At the school, he finds a diary left behind in the desk drawer by the previous teacher, Firdaus Quadri. Children start coming to school after learning that a new teacher has arrived. However, they disobey Kabir, leading him to think that he cannot teach, but after reading Firdaus's diary, he gains confidence and decides to try.

Kabir's girlfriend breaks up with him and is having an affair with a new man, as she believes that Kabir is now unfit to marry her because he has left the army. He is heartbroken but takes solace in the schoolchildren and Firdaus's diary, writing comments in it. He learns about Imran, one of the schoolchildren, whose father, Yakub, wants him to help in the household rather than attending school. Using help from the diary, Kabir succeeds in bringing Imran back to school. He decides to burn Firdaus's diary after learning she is getting married, but retrieves it in a fit of epiphany.

On her wedding day, Firdaus finds out that her fiancé was cheating on her and that the other woman is carrying his child. She calls off the marriage and returns to Wular Public School. The children are overjoyed to have her back, though Kabir is gone. She finds her diary in the same drawer she had left it in a year before and reads Kabir's comments. He had written that he was in love with the writer and had learned valuable lessons from her diary. Curious, Firdaus asks the principal about Kabir the same way he had asked about her. The principal tells her that he has gone to take a teaching course.

One day, Firdaus confronts Yakub, who wants to take Imran back. Imran sees Kabir and runs to him, saying he doesn't want to leave the school. Yakub threatens Kabir with a gun and punches Kabir. Imran, realizing that Yakub might kill Kabir, takes the gun to shoot his father. Kabir stops him. Yakub realizes his mistake and slowly lowers the gun. At the end, it is shown that Firdaus sent the children back home so that she can talk and spend time with Kabir with whom she has fallen in love.

Cast 
 Zaheer Iqbal as Captain (Retd.) Kabir Kaul
 Pranutan Bahl as Firdaus Quadri
 Farhana Bhat as Dolly
 Mir Sarwar as Yakub
 Mozim Bhatt as Junaid
 Mir Mehrooz as Imran
 Mir Zayaan as Tariq
 Baba Hatim as Waqar
 Adiba Bhatt as Dua
 Soliha Maqbool as Shama
 Kosar Chandpuri as Young Yakub
 Saniya Mir as Pregnant girl
 Mallik Mushtaq as Junaid's father
 Saroj Sharma as Junaid's mother
 Ahmed as Young Kabir

Marketing and release 
Salman Khan unveiled the first poster of film on Valentine's Day. A special screening of the film was held for Bollywood stars and family on 28 March 2019. The makers chose not to release the film in Pakistan due to the 2019 Pulwama attack. The film was made available as VOD on Amazon Prime Video in June 2019.

Reception

Critical response 
Nandini Ramnath of Scroll.in writes, "Notebook has an unremarkable lead pair, an underwhelming dull love story in which the actors don't share the screen for nearly the entire duration of the narrative, some of the most ravishing views of Kashmir yet, a bunch of adorable children and a soundtrack with a few good tunes." Rachit Gupta of The Times of India rated the film with three stars out of five and says, "Notebook is an easy watch where you can appreciate the humour, drama and romance. But the film leaves you wanting for more. Perhaps with more creativity in writing, this young romantic saga could have achieved more." Writing for DNA Meena Iyer finds nothing wrong with the film but wished, "it hadn't been so antiseptic." She rates the film with three stars out of five. Jyoti Sharma Bawa of Hindustan Times rates the film with two and half stars out of five and praises the cinematographer Manoj Kumar Khatoi. She opines that the cinematographer has ensured that every frame is bursting with beauty and The visual portrayal would stay with the viewers long after they forget the sub-par love story. Charu Thakur of India Today gives two and half stars out of five and concludes the review as, "If you are looking for some old-world romance this weekend, Notebook is definitely a recommended watch for you." Bollywood Hungama while rating it with three stars out of five they feel that the film would appeal only to multiplex audience. They sum up review by saying, "On the whole, NOTEBOOK boasts of exemplary performances by the debutants and is beautifully shot while stressing on the importance of education."

Soundtrack 

The music and background score of the film is composed by Vishal Mishra while the lyrics are penned by Manoj Muntashir, Kaushal Kishore, Akshay Tripathi, Abhayendra Kumar Upadhyay and Vishal Mishra. The song "Bhumro" is a recreation of the original song from the film Mission Kashmir. "Main tare" was originally sung by Atif Aslam but then removed by Salman Khan. Atif Aslam version was unofficially released on YouTube.

See also 
 Notebook
 The Teacher's Diary

References

External links 

Indian romantic drama films
Indian remakes of Thai films
Films scored by Vishal Mishra
2010s Hindi-language films
Films about the education system in India
Films set in schools
Films about educators
Films produced by Salman Khan
Films distributed by Yash Raj Films
Indian Army in films
Kashmir conflict in films
2019 romantic drama films
Films set in Jammu and Kashmir
Films shot in Jammu and Kashmir